The Vision Council (also known as the Vision Council of America or VCA) is a  nonprofit  trade association for manufacturers and suppliers of the optical industry in the United States. Its services include  research, training and industry networking events. It is located in  Alexandria, Virginia.

References

External links
 The Vision Council

Health industry trade groups based in the United States
Organizations based in Virginia
Eye care in the United States